Giovanni Battista Carlone (1603–1684) was an Italian painter of the Baroque period, active mainly in Genoa.

Biography
Carlone was born and died in Genoa. He came from a family of artists: his father Taddeo, uncle, and cousins were sculptors, and his older brother Giovanni Bernardo Carlone was a painter, trained in Rome and married to the daughter of Bernardo Castello. Giovanni Bernardo, however, died at age 40.

Giovanni Battista may have had some training under Domenico Passignano. He was remarkably prolific both in terms of offspring (24 children) by a single matron (Nicoletta Scorza), and paintings and frescoes; and likely these two facts were not independent, since the sheer output strongly suggests the hands of many in his paintings. His paintings throng local churches; for example, the Basilica della Santissima Annunziata del Vastato alone contains nearly 20 canvases and frescoes. However his artistic profligacy also diluted the force of individuality in the paintings which, in style, seem to occupy an imprecise provincial talent between Mannerism and Baroque. His son, Andrea Carlone was a painter.

In the middle and principal nave of the Vastato, he has represented the Adoration of the Magi; the Entrance of Christ into Jerusalem; the Resurrection; the Ascension ; the Descent of the Holy Ghost; and the Assumption of the Virgin. In the same church he painted Presentation in the Temple and Christ preaching to the Pharisees.

Works

 Miracolo del basilisco, crocefissione di San Pietro, conversione di San Pietro, frescoes at the vault of San Siro church, Genoa
Miracolo del beato Salvatore da Horta - oil on canvas 280 cm × 185 cm, Basilica della Santissima Annunziata del Vastato, Genoa
Giuseppe riconosciuto dai fratelli, Accademia Ligustica di Belle Arti, Genoa
Adorazione dei pastori (Adoration of the Shepherds), Accademia Ligustica di Belle Arti, Genoa
Gesù comunica santa Gertrude, Albergo dei poveri, Genoa
Flagellazione di Santa Caterina d'Alessandria and Santa Caterina liberata dal demonio, Certosa di Pavia
Assunzione della Vergine, Cassa di Risparmio, Genoa
Martirio di San Lorenzo (Martyrdom of Saint Lawrence), San Lorenzo oratory, Cogoleto
 Saint Sebastian, Fondation Bemberg, Toulouse

References

 
 

1603 births
1684 deaths
Painters from Genoa
Italian Baroque painters
17th-century Italian painters
Italian male painters